22d Reconnaissance Squadron may refer to:

 The 912th Air Refueling Squadron, constituted as the 22d Reconnaissance Squadron (Heavy) in January 1942 but redesignated the 412th Bombardment Squadron before being activated in June 1942. 
 The 22d Intelligence Squadron, designated the 22d Reconnaissance Squadron (Bombardment) from April 1943 to August 1943. 
 The 622d Expeditionary Air Refueling Squadron, designated the 22d Reconnaissance Squadron, Photographic from October 1947 to June 1949. 
 The 22d Attack Squadron, designated the 22d Reconnaissance Squadron from September 2012 to May 2015.

See also 
 The 22d Photographic Reconnaissance Squadron 
 The 22d Tactical Reconnaissance Squadron